Wir sind Helden (German for We are heroes) is the third album by Wir sind Helden, released on 29 May 2006 in France. The album consisted of a number of tracks from their first two albums (Die Reklamation and Von hier an blind) along with French versions of some songs.

The album was the group's first official release in France, and included all singles preceding its release, though none charted in France.

Track listing

 Le vide (Von hier an blind) 
 Wenn es passiert
 Guten Tag (La Réclamation)
 Denkmal (#26 Germany, #41 Austria)
 Echolot
 Ein elefant für dich 
 Darf ich das behalten
 Ist das so?
 Gekommen um zu bleiben
 Nur ein Wort
 Aurélie (C'est pas Paris)
 Müssen nur wollen (#57 Germany)
 Du erkennst mich nicht wieder
 Die Zeit heilt alle Wunder
 Von hier an blind
 Aurélie (#47 Germany)
 Guten Tag (#53 Germany)

Wir sind Helden albums
2006 compilation albums
Virgin Records compilation albums